The Michael M. Hiegel House is a historic house at 504 Second Street in Conway, Arkansas.  It is a picturesque -story structure, finished in brick and stucco and covered by a gable-on-hip roof.  The main facade bays are articulated by brick pilasters, with the two right bays filled with round-arch windows, and the bay to their left housing the main entrance, deeply recessed under a similar rounded arch.  To its left is a projecting gable-arched section with a pair of sash windows.  Built about 1911, it is a high quality local example of Tudor Revival architecture.  It was built by Michael Hiegel, a prominent local businessman who operated a grocery store and lumber business, and was active in local political affairs.

The house was listed on the National Register of Historic Places in 1998.

See also
National Register of Historic Places listings in Faulkner County, Arkansas

References

Houses on the National Register of Historic Places in Arkansas
Tudor Revival architecture in the United States
Houses completed in 1911
Houses in Conway, Arkansas